The 1886 Mid Armagh by-election was a parliamentary by-election held on 1 February 1886 for the British House of Commons constituency of Mid Armagh in Ireland.  The seat had become vacant when the Conservative Member of Parliament (MP) John McKane had died on 11 January 1886.  McKane had held the seat since it had been created for the 1885 general election. The Conservative candidate, Sir James Corry, previously an MP for Belfast, held the seat for the party.

Result

References

Parliamentary Election Results in Ireland, 1801-1922, edited by B.M. Walker (Royal Irish Academy 1978)

1886 elections in the United Kingdom
By-elections to the Parliament of the United Kingdom in County Armagh constituencies
19th century in County Armagh
1886 elections in Ireland